Barry J. Beitzel (born August 6, 1942, in Mechanicsburg, Pennsylvania) is an Old Testament scholar, geographer, cartographer, and translator of the Bible. He currently resides in Mundelein, Illinois.

Appointments 
Barry J. Beitzel has been a member of the Department of Old Testament and Semitic Languages at Trinity Evangelical Divinity School (TEDS; Deerfield, Illinois) since 1976, as Assistant Professor (1976-1980), Associate Professor (1980-1985; tenured 1983), Professor (1985–2016), and Professor Emeritus (2016 to the present). He served as Associate Academic Dean between the years 1986–1996 and as Executive Vice-President/Provost throughout 1996–2004.Dr. Beitzel is married to his wife Carol (née Watson); together they have three children (Bradley Jay [1968], Bryan Kent [1970], Kelly Melinda [1980]) and ten grandchildren.

Education and scholarship
Following a BA in Bible and an MA in Old Testament, Beitzel matriculated into The Dropsie University (Philadelphia; merged with the University of Pennsylvania in 1993), where he earned a PhD degree in ancient Near Eastern Languages and Literatures in 1976; his dissertation is titled "The Place Names in the Mari Texts:  An Onomastic and Toponymic Study," supervised by Nahum M. Waldman, Theodor H. Gaster, and Hayim M. I. Gevaryahu.  Beitzel also studied Semitic Linguistics at Fuller Theological Seminary (Pasadena, 1969-72) and General Linguistics at the University of Pennsylvania (Philadelphia, 1973). He obtained a post-doctorate in ancient Near Eastern Geography at L’Université de Liège (Belgium, 1981), where he worked with the doyen of Near Eastern geography, Professor J.-R. Kupper, as well as with the renowned Assyriologist, Professor Georges Dossin.  Beitzel's academic areas of interest include the geographic and spatial dimension of the biblical storylines within the context of their physical world.  His primary archaeological work relates to the geographic context and socio-spatiality of the network of paved communication and transportation arteries and unpaved thoroughfares across the ancient Near East, more recently focusing on the structure and location of ancient roadways and milestones in the southern Levant east of the Jordan River (corresponding mostly with the modern country of Jordan); he also spent one season in eastern Syria, with the UCLA team excavating the site of Tell Ashara (ancient Terqa, 1980), where he was also a member of the geographical team surveying the terrain and searching for undiscovered ancient sites in the Middle Euphrates and Lower Habur River valleys. Beitzel's  professional work has taken him to Western Asia and/or the greater Mediterranean world on more than 50 occasions. He has also lectured in various countries, including Belgium, Canada, Egypt, Great Britain, Greece, Ireland, Israel, Jordan, South Korea, Philippines, and Syria.  Beitzel has contributed to such serial publications as Archaeology in the Biblical World; Bible Review; Biblical Archaeology Review; Biblical Archaeologist; Bulletin of the American Schools of Oriental Research; Iraq, the British Schools of Archaeology in Iraq; Journal of the American Oriental Society; ANE Today; Journal of the Evangelical Theological Society; Trinity Journal; and the Journal of Near Eastern Studies.  He has contributed chapters to numerous monographs as well as essays in the Festschriften of Cyrus H. Gordon (Neukirchen-Vluyn:  Verlag Butzon & Bercker Kevelaer, 1973); William Sanford LaSor (Grand Rapids:  Eerdmans, 1978); Gleason L. Archer (Chicago: Moody Press, 1986); Michael C. Astour (Bethesda: CDL Press, 1992); and K. Lawson Younger, Jr. (München:  Zaphon, 2022).  He served as senior translator for the New Living Translation, the Historical Books.

Selected publications

Monographs 
Barry J. Beitzel. The Moody Atlas of Bible Lands. Chicago: Moody Press, 1985. . 
 Winner, 1986 American Congress on Surveying and Mapping Map Design Competition, sponsored by the Association of American Geographers.
 Finalist, 1986 Evangelical Christian Publishers Gold Medallion Book Award for the "Bible and Reference Study" category.

__.  Associate Editor and Author, "Baker Encyclopedia of the Bible."  Grand Rapids:  Baker Book House, 1988.  .

__. Chief Consultant, Cartographer, and Author, Biblica, the Bible Atlas: A Social and Historical Journey Through the Lands of the Bible. London: Viking/Penguin Press, 2006. . 
 Translated into 17 foreign language editions.  
 Also published as Biblica, the Bible Atlas:  The Story of the Greatest Story Ever Told. Sydney:  Global Publishing, 2006; . Also published as Bible Atlas: The events, people, and places of the Bible from Genesis to Revelation. London: SPCK, 2013; . Also published as The Bible:  History, Geography, Worship. Ft Wayne, IN:  Sweetwater Press, 2014; .

__. Member of the Board of Advisers and Chief Map Consultant, The Biblical World: An Illustrated Atlas. Washington, D.C.: National Geographic Society, 2007. .

__. The New Moody Atlas of the Bible. Chicago: Moody; Oxford: Lion Hudson, 2009. .
 Translated into seven foreign language editions:  Dutch (2012), Italian (2012), German (2013), Korean (2015), Spanish (2017), Portuguese (2017), and (to be released in 2023) Chinese.
 Winner, 2010 Evangelical Christian Publishers Gold Medallion Book Award for the "Bible Reference and Study" category.
 "2010 Best in Category" in the Book/Atlas category at the 37th Annual Map Design Competition sponsored by the Cartographic and Geographic Information Systems [CaGIS] of the Association of American Geographers.
__.  Creator, Beitzel Photolibrary.  Bellingham, WA:  Logos Bible Software, 2016.

__. Cartographer, Logos Bible Software Atlas. Logos Bible Software, Computer Software.  Bellingham, WA:  Faithlife Corporation, 2017.  (See also Logos 6 Maps (Vols. 1-3):  Dataset Documentation.  Bellingham, WA:  Faithlife Corporation, 2017).

__. General Editor and Author, Lexham Geographic Commentary on the Gospels.  Bellingham, WA:  Logos Bible Software and Lexham Press, 2016, 2018.  .
 Winner, Christianity Today "2019 Book Award in Biblical Studies."
Finalist, 2019 Evangelical Christian Publishers Gold Medallion Book Award for the "Bible Reference and Study" category [see https://christianbookawards.com/finalists.html]. 
Translated into a Korean foreign language edition (2021).

__. General Editor and Author, Lexham Geographic Commentary on Acts Through Revelation.  Bellingham, WA:  Logos Bible Software and Lexham Press, 2019.  .
Finalist, 2019 Best Books in Biblical Theology, Reference Works [see https://dbs.mbts.edu/2020/02/13/finalists.html].

__. General Editor and Author, Lexham Geographic Commentary on the Pentateuch.' Bellingham, WA:  Logos Bible Software and Lexham Press, 2023.

__.  Where Was the Biblical Red Sea?  Examining the Ancient Evidence. (Lexham Studies in Biblical Archaeology, Geography, and History 1). Bellingham, WA: Logos Bible Software and Lexham Press, 2020. .
Finalist, 2020 Best Books in Old Testament Studies (Center for Biblical Studies).

__. General Editor and Author, Lexham Geographic Commentary on the Historical Books.  2 vols.  Bellingham, WA:  Logos Bible Software and Lexham Press, 2021-2022.  (LexhamPress.com).

__. General Editor and Author, Lexham Geographic Commentary on the Poetic and Prophetic Books. Bellingham, WA:  Logos Bible Software and Lexham Press, 2022.  (LexhamPress.com).

__. Editor, Lexham Studies in Biblical Archaeology, Geography, and History.  Bellingham, WA:  Lexham Publishers, 2020--.  (LexhamPress.com).

 Maps 
Maps executed and/or supervised by Beitzel appear in Bibles published by:
 Moody Press (including the Ryrie KJV Study Bible; the Ryrie NASB Study Bible; the Ryrie NIV Study Bible; the Ryrie ESV Study Bible), 1986, 1991, 1994, 2002, 2010, 2011, 2012, 2017, 2020, 2022.
 Zondervan Publishing House (including the NIV; the NIV Study Bible; the Revised NIV Study Bible; the Zondervan New American Standard Bible; the Zondervan New Revised Standard Version; the NIV Archaeological Study Bible; the NIV Zondervan Study Bible; the NIV Cultural Backgrounds Study Bible; the NIV Faithlife Study Bible; the NIV Study Bible Biblical Theology; the NIV Grace and Truth Study Bible), 1987, 1989, 1990, 2009, 2011, 2015, 2017, 2018, 2020, 2021, 2022.
 B. B. Kirkbride Bible Company (including the Thompson Chain-Reference Bible; the Thompson Chain-Reference Study Bible [all Versions]), 1989, 1991, 1997, 2004, 2010, 2011, 2017, 2019.
 Tyndale House Publishers (including the NLT; the NLT Study Bible; the Life Application Study Bible), 1996, 2003, 2004, 2007, 2008, 2011, 2015, 2016, 2018, 2021, 2022.
 Holman Bible Publishers (including the Holman Illustrated Study Bible; the Christian Standard Bible; the CSB Holy Land Illustrated Bible), 2006, 2017, 2020.
 Crossway Bibles (including the ESV; the ESV Study Bible; the ESV Archaeology Study Bible; ESV Student Study Bible), 2007, 2008, 2017, 2018, 2019, 2021.
 Thomas Nelson Publishers (including the Nelson Study Bible; the NKJV Study Bible), 2008, 2019.
 Bible Truth Publishers (J. N. Darby Translation), 2016.
 Schuyler Publishers [all Versions], 2016, 2017, 2018, 2019, 2020, 2021, 2022.
 R. L. Allan Bibles (including Allan NLT; Allan ESV), 2016, 2019, 2020.

He has also supervised the production of maps for A Short History of Ancient Israel (Biblical Archaeology Society, 1988); Holman Bible Atlas (Broadman & Holman, 1998); Logos Electronic Atlas of the Bible (Logos/FaithLife, 2005); and the ESV Bible Atlas (Crossway, 2010).  Some of his maps appear in the Atlas of the Ancient World (National Geographic, 2016, 2019).  Over the years, he has executed or consulted on a dozen or so maps appearing in National Geographic,'' most recently in the following issues: 189.4 (April, 1996, [insets]); 214.6 (December, 2008, p. 43); 218.6 (December, 2010, p. 74 [foldout]); 221.3 (March, 2012, p. 51); and 232.6 (December, 2017, pp. 48–50, 57 [foldouts]).

References

External links
 Professional Website

Living people
1942 births
Old Testament scholars
People from Cumberland County, Pennsylvania
People from Mundelein, Illinois